M35, M.35 or M-35 may refer to:

Military
 M35 series 2½-ton 6×6 cargo truck, a US Army truck
 , a Royal Navy mine countermeasures vessel launched in 1982
 ADGZ or M35 Mittlere Panzerwagen, a 1930s Austrian Army heavy armored car
 Cannone da 47/32 M35, an Austrian artillery piece produced under license in Italy during World War II
 PRB M35 mine; see List of land mines
 Vollmer M35, a series of 1930s experimental automatic rifles developed by Heinrich Vollmer
 M35 Stahlhelm, a type of German World War II helmet
 M35 prime mover, a US Army artillery tractor based on the M10A1 tank destroyer

Science and technology
 Messier 35, an open star cluster 
 M35 high-speed steel
 British NVC community M35, a mire community; see Mires in the British National Vegetation Classification system
 M35, a subgroup of Haplogroup M

Transportation

Land
 Citroën M35, a French prototype car
 Infiniti M35, a Japanese luxury car
 M35 motorway (Hungary), a motorway
 M35 (Cape Town), a Metropolitan Route in Cape Town, South Africa
 M35 (Johannesburg), a Metropolitan Route in Johannesburg, South Africa
 M35 (Pretoria), a Metropolitan Route in Pretoria, South Africa
 M35 (Durban), a Metropolitan Route in Durban, South Africa
 M35 (New York City bus), a New York City Bus route in Manhattan, United States
 M-35 (Michigan highway), a state highway in Michigan, United States
 M35, station code of JA Hiroshimabyoin-mae Station, Hiroshima, Japan

Air
 Beech Model 35 Bonanza, an American general aviation aircraft
 BFW M.35, also known as the Messerschmitt M 35, a German sports plane of the early 1930s
 Miles M.35 Libellula, an experimental British aircraft of 1941
 M35, FAA location ID for Lindey's Landing West Seaplane Base, Montana, United States

Other uses
 M35, a postcode for Failsworth, Greater Manchester, England
 M35, an Egyptian hieroglyph; see List of Egyptian hieroglyphs § M35